Hulstina exhumata is a species of geometrid moth in the family Geometridae. It is found in North America.

The MONA or Hodges number for Hulstina exhumata is 6546.

References

Further reading

 

Boarmiini
Articles created by Qbugbot
Moths described in 1918